Peter Wilson (born October 22, 1952, in Ottawa, Ontario) was a Canadian ski jumper  who competed internationally from 1971 to 1976.  Peter competed in the 1972 Winter Olympics at Sapporo and 1976 Winter Olympics in Innsbruck and the 1972 Planica and 1973 Oberstdorf World Ski Flying Championships, and the 1974 FIS World Nordic Ski Championships in Falun.  He also rowed for the Ottawa Rowing Club and won at the Royal Canadian Henley in the 145 lb. fours with (1972) and without coxswain (1973).

References

External links 

 

1952 births
Living people
Canadian male ski jumpers
Olympic ski jumpers of Canada
Ski jumpers at the 1972 Winter Olympics
Ski jumpers at the 1976 Winter Olympics